Genesee is a town in Allegany County, New York, United States. The population was 1,653 at the 2020 census. Genesee is in the southwestern corner of the county, southeast of Olean.

History

The first settler arrived circa 1823. The town of Genesee was established in 1830 from a division of the town of Cuba.

Much of the early economy was based on harvesting the forests, but oil production began in approximately 1890.

Geography

The south town line is the Pennsylvania (McKean County) border, and the west town line is shared with the town of Portville in Cattaraugus County.

New York State Route 417 is an important east-west highway through the town.

Demographics

As of the census of 2000, there were 1,803 people, 661 households, and 493 families residing in the town. The population density was 49.7 people per square mile (19.2/km2). There were 800 housing units at an average density of 22.0 per square mile (8.5/km2). The racial makeup of the town was 99.11% White, 0.06% African American, 0.11% Native American, 0.33% from other races, and 0.39% from two or more races. Hispanic or Latino of any race were 1.22% of the population.

There were 661 households, out of which 38.6% had children under the age of 18 living with them, 61.9% were married couples living together, 7.1% had a female householder with no husband present, and 25.4% were non-families. 19.7% of all households were made up of individuals, and 7.7% had someone living alone who was 65 years of age or older. The average household size was 2.73 and the average family size was 3.12.

In the town, the population was spread out, with 28.8% under the age of 18, 7.7% from 18 to 24, 29.6% from 25 to 44, 23.8% from 45 to 64, and 10.1% who were 65 years of age or older. The median age was 36 years. For every 100 females, there were 101.7 males. For every 100 females age 18 and over, there were 103.5 males.

The median income for a household in the town was $38,563, and the median income for a family was $44,100. Males had a median income of $31,047 versus $22,557 for females. The per capita income for the town was $16,169. About 8.9% of families and 11.8% of the population were below the poverty line, including 13.7% of those under age 18 and 5.4% of those age 65 or over.

Communities and locations in Genesee

Bowler – A location by Route 417 and the south town line.
Little Genesee – A hamlet on Route 417 in the eastern part of the town.
Little Genesee Creek – A stream in the southeast part of the town.
Ceres – A hamlet on Route 417 at the Oswayo Creek near the Pennsylvania border, so part of the community is in that state. The Ceres School was listed on the National Register of Historic Places in 2010.
Obi – A location in the northwest part of the town by Route 305.
Sanford – A location on Route 417 in southwest of Little Genesee.

References

External links
 Genesee history
 Brief history of the town of Genesee

Towns in Allegany County, New York
1830 establishments in New York (state)
Populated places established in 1830